Werner is a name of German origin. Werner, meaning “the defender” or “the defending warrior”, is common both as a given name and a surname. There are alternate spellings, such as the Scandinavian Verner.

The name was popular in the Habsburg family.

Werner I (Bishop of Strasbourg) (c. 980 – 1028)
Werner I, Count of Habsburg (c. 1025 – 1096)
Werner II, Count of Habsburg (d. 1167)

People with the surname

A–H
Abraham Gottlob Werner (1749–1817), German geologist
Alfred Werner (1866–1919), Swiss Nobel Prize–winning chemist
Alice Werner (1859-1935), German/English writer and poet
André Werner (born 1960), German composer
Annette Werner (born 1966), German mathematician
Anton von Werner (1843–1915), German painter
Björn Werner (born 1990), German player of American football
Brian Werner (born 1966), American Tiger Conservationist, founder of Tiger Missing Link Foundation
Buddy (Wallace Jerold) Werner (1936–1964), American alpine skier
C. W. Otto Werner (1879–1936), German physician, discoverer of the premature aging condition, Werner syndrome
Carla Werner, New Zealander/Australian singer-songwriter
Emmy Werner (1929-2017), American psychologist
E. T. C. Werner (Edward Theodore Chalmers Werner), (1864–1954), British diplomat and sinologist 
Éric Werner (born 1940), Swiss philosopher
Franz von Werner (1836–1881), Austrian and Ottoman diplomat and writer, known as Murad Effendi
Franz Werner (1867–1939), Austrian herpetologist and entomologist
Friedrich Ludwig Zacharias Werner (1768–1823), German poet, dramatist and preacher
Fritz Werner (1898–1977), German conductor and composer
Georg Werner (1904–2002), Swedish swimmer
Gerhard Werner (1921–2012), Austrian/American neuroscientist 
Götz Werner (1944–2022), German entrepreneur
Gregor Werner (1693–1766), Austrian composer
Heinrich Werner (composer) (1800–1833), German composer
Heinrich Werner (physician) (1874–1946), German physician
Hildegard Werner (1834–1911), Swedish musician

I–Z
Ilse Werner (1921–2005), Dutch/German singer/actress
Jan Werner (athlete) (1946-2014), Polish sprinter
Johannes Werner (1466–1528), German priest and cartographer, inventor of the Werner map projection
Josiah Werner (born 1980), American rock musician
Jürgen Werner (disambiguation), multiple people
Karel Werner (1925–2019), Czech philosopher
Karl Werner (disambiguation), multiple people
Katrin Werner (born 1973), German politician
Lars Werner (1935–2013), Swedish politician
Marco Werner (born 1966), German car racer, two times winner of 24 Hours of Le Mans
Markus Werner (1944–2016), Swiss writer
Mike Werner (born 1971), German footballer
Oskar Werner (1922–1984), Austrian theatre and movie actor
Pe Werner (born 1960), German singer
Pete Werner (born 1999), American football player
Pierre Werner (1913–2002), Luxembourgian politician
Reinhold von Werner (1825–1909), German naval officer
Sabine Werner (born 1960), German biochemist
Gladys "Skeeter" Werner Walker (1933–2001), American alpine skier
Sofia Werner (born 2003), American Singer/Songwriter
Stephanie C. Werner, German-Norwegian geologist and planetologist
Susan Werner (born 1965), American singer/songwriter
Susan Elizabeth Werner Kieffer (born 1942), American physical geologist and planetary scientist
Theodore B. Werner (1892–1989), American politician
Timo Werner (born 1996), German footballer
Tom Preston-Werner (born 1979), American entrepreneur (GitHub)
Tom Werner (born 1950), American television producer of Carsey-Werner Productions and owner of the Boston Red Sox
Tommy Werner (born 1966), Swedish swimmer
Wendelin Werner (born 1968), French mathematician, winner of the Fields medal in 2006
Wilhelm Werner (188-1945), German naval and SS officer
Yehudah Leopold Werner (born 1931), Israeli zoologist
Zack Werner (born 1960), Canadian artist and producer; judge on Canadian Idol

People with the given name

Given name only
Werner, Margrave of the Nordmark (died 1014), Margrave of the Nordmark 1003–1009

A–J
Werner Aisslinger (born 1964), German furniture designer
Werner Abrolat (1924–1997), German actor and voice actor
Werner Aspenström (1918–1997), Swedish poet
Werner Asam (born 1944), German television actor, director and writer
Werner Best (1903–1989), high-ranking Nazi official during World War II
Werner Bochmann (1900–1993), German composer
Werner Braune (1909–1951), German Nazi SS officer, executed for war crimes
Werner Bruschke (1898–1995), East German politician
Werner Cabrera, Peruvian politician
Werner Christie (born 1949), Norwegian Labour Party politician, former Minister of Social Affairs and Health and Social Affairs
Werner Dankwort (1895–1986), German diplomat before and after the Nazi era
Werner Erhard (born 1935), American founder of Erhard Seminars Training (EST) and The Landmark Forum
Rainer Werner Fassbinder (1945–1982), German movie director, screenwriter and actor
Werner Faymann (born 1960), Austrian politician
Werner Finck (1902–1978), German comedian
Werner Fenchel (1905–1988), German mathematician
Werner Forssmann, (1904–1979), German physician, received Nobel Prize for cardiological studies
Werner Franz (born 1972), Austrian alpine skier
Werner Funck (1881–1951), German stage and film actor, singer and film director
Werner Günthör (born 1961), Swiss olympic track and field athlete
Werner Hamacher (born 1948), German deconstructive literary critic and theorist
Werner Heisenberg (1901–1976), German quantum physicist and Nobel laureate
Werner Herzog (born 1942), German film and opera actor, director, and screenwriter
Werner Wolfgang Heubeck (1923–2009), German transport executive, former managing director of Ulsterbus and Citybus
Werner Heuser (1880–1964), German painter
Werner Heyking (1913–1974), Danish actor
Werner Hippler (born 1970), plays American football in Germany for the Cologne Centurions, formerly played for Frankfurt Galaxy
Werner Z. Hirsch (1920–2009), German-born American economist
Werner Hoeger (born 1954), Venezuelan Olympic athlete
Werner D. Horn, American politician
Werner Hug (born 1952), Swiss chess-player
Werner Jäger (born 1959), Austrian speed skater

K–Z
Werner Kiem (born 1962), Italian biathlete
Werner Klemperer (1920–2000), German actor
Werner Koch (born 1961), German free-software author
Werner Kohlmeyer (1924–1974), West German football (soccer) player
Werner Krämer (1940–2010), West German football (soccer) player
Werner Krauss (1884–1959), German film actor
Werner Kutzelnigg (1933–2019), prominent Austrian-German theoretical chemist
Werner Lička (born 1954), Czech football (soccer) player and manager
Werner Liebrich (1927–1995), German football (soccer) player and coach
Werner Mölders, Nazi German Luftwaffe fighter ace in World War II
Werner Munter (1941–2007), Swiss mountaineering expert
Werner of Oberwesel (1271–1287), Christian boy allegedly murdered by Jews but venerated as a saint and martyr
Hans Werner Olm (born Hans Olm, 1955), German television and film comedian
Werner Otto (cyclist) (born 1948), East German track cyclist
Werner Perathoner (born 1967), Italian alpine skier 
Werner Peter (born 1950), East German football (soccer) player
Werner Potzernheim (1927–2014), German road bicycle and track cyclist
Werner Rahn (born 1939), German naval officer and naval historian
Werner Reiterer (born 1968), Australian discus thrower
Werner Rolevinck (1425–1502), Carthusian monk 
Werner Roth (footballer, born 1925), coach of Karlsruher SC in the 1960s
Werner Roth (footballer, born 1948), American soccer player
Werner Roth (comics) (1921–1973), American comic book artist
Werner Schildhauer (born 1959), East German track and field athlete
Werner Schmidt (born 1932), Canadian politician
Werner Schmieder (born 1926), German politician
Werner Schnitzer (born 1942), German television actor
Werner Schroeter (1945–2010), German film director
Werner Sobek (born 1953), German architect and research engineer
Werner Stengel (born 1936), German engineer and roller-coaster designer
Werner Stocker (actor) (1955–1993), German film and television actor
Werner von Siemens (1816–1892), German inventor and industrialist
Werner von Blomberg (1878–1946) German General Staff officer and first Minister of War
Werner von Fritsch (1880–1939), member of the German High Command and commander-in-chief of the German Army
Werner von Urslingen (1308–1354), German mercenary
Werner Vogels (born 1958), Dutch-American Amazon CTO
Werner Voss (1897–1917), German World War I fighter ace
Werner Weinhold (born 1949), Former NVA soldier and defector to West Germany
Werner Zorn (born 1942), German computer scientist

See also

Warner (given name)
Warner (surname)

German masculine given names
Dutch masculine given names
Norwegian masculine given names
Swedish masculine given names
Danish masculine given names
Masculine given names
Jewish surnames
Surnames from given names